The Swedish Lapphund is a breed of dog of the Spitz type from Sweden, one of three Lapphund breeds developed from a type of dog used by the Sami people for herding and guarding their reindeer.
The expression "the black beauty of Norrland" is very often attributed to the Swedish lapphund, which is most likely one of Sweden's oldest breeds.

Lineage
The breed falls under the mitochondrial DNA sub-clade referred to as d1 that is only found in northern Scandinavia. It is the result of a female wolf-male dog hybridization that occurred post-domestication. Subclade d1 originated 480–3,000 years ago and is found in all Sami-related breeds: Finnish Lapphund, Swedish Lapphund, Lapponian Herder, Jamthund, Norwegian Elkhound and Hällefors Elkhound. The maternal wolf sequence that contributed to these breeds has not been matched across Eurasia and its branch on the phylogenetic tree is rooted in the same sequence as the 33,000 year-old Altai dog (not a direct ancestor).

Description
Like all spitz dogs in general, the Swedish lapphund demands a stable upbringing and both regular mental and physical stimulation to perform at its best. As a working dog they show their versatility in a number of different fields.
Many compete with success in such widely different disciplines as obedience,
dog agility trials, working contest, freestyle/heelwork to music, Rally obedience, and blood
tracking. The Swedish Lapphund can also participate in herding events. Herding instincts and trainability can be measured at noncompetitive herding tests. Lapphunds exhibiting basic herding instincts can be trained to compete in herding trials.

See also
 Dogs portal
 List of dog breeds
 Finnish Lapphund
 Lapponian Herder

References

FCI breeds
Spitz breeds
Herding dogs
Dog breeds originating in Sweden
Rare dog breeds